Rhino is a 2021 drama film written and directed by Oleg Sentsov, created as a co-production of Ukraine, Poland and Germany.

The world premiere of Rhino took place on September 9, 2021, at the 78th Venice Film Festival in the Orizzonti section.

Plot 
Starting out as an aggressive delinquent, a young man nicknamed “Rhino” quickly works his way up the criminal hierarchy in 1990's Ukraine. Rhino has only known power and cruelty, but with nothing left to lose, could he finally find a chance at redemption?

Cast

Production

Budget 

In July 2020, Ukraine's Council for State Support of Cinematography made a decision to support the Rhino film project – funding received from the Ukrainian State Film Agency was ₴25.0 mil. UAH, which amounted to about 50% of the film's total budget of ₴50.0 mil. UAH (€1.6 mil. EUR). Overall the film has received ₴46.0 mil. UAH (€1.45 mil. EUR) in funding from governmental film institutions which represents around 92% of the overall budget of ₴50.0 mil. UAH  (€1.6 mil. EUR); speficifcally, the Ukrainian State Film Agency contributed 50% (₴25.0 mil. UAH / €800.0 thousdand EUR), the Council of Europe's Eurimages Fund contributed 17% (₴8.6 mil. UAH / €270.0 thousand EUR), the Polish Film Institute contributed 15% (₴7.5 mil. UAH / €232.6 тис. EUR / zl1 million), and the German film fund Medienboard Berlin-Brandenburg contributed 10% (₴4.8 mil. UAH / €150.0 thousand EUR).

Screenplay 
The story centers around a gangster Rhino, who's trying to survive Ukraine's "wild 90s". In August–September 2021 in his interviews for Deadline Hollywood and The Hollywood Reporter Sentsov confessed that he decided to make a movie about Ukraine's wild crime-infested 90s because he believes that to date "[Ukraine hasn't made any] movies about the “wild” 90s". Sensov also shared that the prototype for the film's main character, Rhino, was one of Sentsov's friends.

Filming 
In 2012 film's director and writer Oleh Sentsov presented Rhino film project at the industry platform of the Sofia International Film Festival, where it received awards for Best Project and Best Pitching. Additionally in 2012 Sentsov presented Rhino film project at the producer pitching meeting of Odesa International Film Festival where the project won a grant of ₴25 thousand UAH. However, work on the film was suspended in 2014 due to Sentsov's illegal arrest by Russian security services and his subsequent incarceration. Work on the project only resumed after Oleh Sentsov was released by Russia in September 2019 as a part of Russia-Ukraine prisoner exchange.

Filming began in July 2020 and ended in December 2020 and took place in Kryvyi Rih, Lviv and Kyiv.

The film is a co-production of Ukraine, Poland and Germany. The Ukrainian side of production is represented by producer Denys Ivanov's Arthouse Traffic and Oleh Sentsov's Cry Cinema. Polish partners are Apple Film Production, German – Ma.ja.de. film company. The international distributor of the film is WestEnd Films.

Marketing

Promotion 
On September 6, 2021, industry publication cineuropa.org released the first official international film poster. A day later on September 7, 2021, industry publication Deadline released the first official international film trailer. Fostylen magazine called the trailer impressive.

Release 
The world premiere of Rhino took place on September 9, 2021, at the 78th Venice Film Festival in the Orizzonti section; it was the closing film of the Orizzonti section.

Awards and nominations 
Venice Film Festival — Orizzonti Section, Nomination: Best Film
Batumi International Art-House Film Festival — International competition, Nomination: Best Film; Winner: Best Actor (Serhii Filimonov)
Warsaw Film Festival — International competition, Nomination: Best Film
Thessaloniki International Film Festival — Open Horizons, Non-Competition
CPH PIX — The Wild Side, Non-Competition
Stockholm International Film Festival — International competition, Winner: Best Film, Best Actor (Serhii Filimonov)
52nd International Film Festival of India — International Panorama, Non-Competition
Les Arcs Film Festival — Playtime, Non-Competition
Ulsan International Film Festival — UIFF Premiere, Non-Competition
Sofia International Film Festival — Special screening, Non-Competition
Taipei Golden Horse Fantastic Film Festival — Fantasy of the Year, Non-Competition
International Istanbul Film Festival — International competition, Nomination: Best Film
D'A Film Festival — Transicions, Nomination: Audience Award
Transilvania International Film Festival — TIFF For Ukraine, Non-Competition
Lubuskie Lato Filmowe — Main Competition, Winner: Best Film
Aegean Film Festival — Feature films, Non-Competition
Motovun Film Festival — Main Program, Nomination: Best Film
Atlàntida Mallorca Film Festival — Official Competition, Nomination: Best Film

References

External links 
 
 
 
 Rhino at DzygaMDB (in Ukrainian)
 Rhino at dergkino.gov.ua  (in Ukrainian)
 Rhino at WestEnd Films

2021 films
2021 drama films
Ukrainian-language films
Ukrainian drama films
Polish drama films
German drama films
2020s German films